The 2013–14 season was Swansea City's 94th season in the English football league system, and their third consecutive season in the Premier League.

During pre-season Swansea recruited heavily, breaking the clubs' transfer record fee with the purchase of Ivorian striker Wilfried Bony from Vitesse Arnhem for £12 million. They also acquired Jonjo Shelvey from Liverpool for £5 million. Other significant signings included Alejandro Pozuelo and José Cañas, who both signed from Real Betis, and Spanish defender Jordi Amat from Espanyol for £2.5 million, Only two players left the club during the summer—Kemy Agustien moved to Brighton & Hove Albion on a free transfer on 1 August 2013, and Luke Moore was released by the club on 23 August 2013.

In the Premier League, Swansea lost to defending champions Manchester United 1–4 at the Liberty Stadium in their first game of the season. They picked up their first win of the league campaign on 2 September in a 0–2 away win against West Bromwich Albion. On 4 February 2014, manager Michael Laudrup was sacked by chairman Huw Jenkins following a 2–0 defeat to West Ham United. It was Swansea's sixth defeat in eight league games and left Swansea two points above the relegation zone. Garry Monk was appointed as the interim player-manager. Monk was appointed as the permanent manager of Swansea City on 7 May, signing a three-year contract. In the final game of the season Swansea beat Sunderland 1–3 at the Stadium of Light, ensuring they finished with 42 points in 12th place in the league table.

Swansea City competed in two domestic cups, the FA Cup, and the Football League Cup. Swansea entered the League Cup in the third round as the defending champions, but were knocked out of the competition in their opening match to Birmingham City, 3–1. In the FA Cup, Swansea advanced to the fifth round, but lost 3–1 to Everton at Goodison Park.

Swansea competed in the 2013–14 UEFA Europa League, their first European competition since the 1991–92 European Cup Winners' Cup. They were eliminated in the Round of 32 by Napoli, having drawn the home game 0–0 and losing the away game 3–1.

Squad and coaching staff information

First team squad 
Last updated on 11 May 2014. The following players were included in at least one matchday squad in the 2013–14 season.

Club staff

Backroom staff

Board of directors

Transfers and loans

Transfer in

Transfer out

Loan in

Loan out

New contracts

Pre-season and friendlies
The 2013–14 was season preceded by a ten-day tour of the Netherlands.

Last updated: 28 June 2013Source:

Competitions

Overall

Premier League

League table

Results summary

Results by matchday

Matches

Source: Swansea City A.F.C.

UEFA Europa League

Third qualifying round

Play-off round

Group stage

Knockout phase

Round of 32

Source: Swansea City A.F.C.

FA Cup

Source: Swansea City A.F.C.

League Cup

Source: Swansea City A.F.C.

Statistics

Appearances and goals
Last updated on 11 May 2014
Players with no appearances are not included in the list.

Clean sheets
This includes all competitive matches. The list is sorted by shirt number when total clean sheets are equal.
Last updated on 13 April 2014

Disciplinary record
This includes all competitive matches. The list is sorted by shirt number when total cards are equal. The list for the Europa League is sorted into Tournament Phase and Qualifying Phase since all yellow cards and pending yellow-card suspensions expire on completion of the Qualifying Phase play-offs.
Last updated on 11 May 2014

Overall summary

Summary
Last updated on 11 May 2014

Score overview

Notes

References

2013-14
2013–14 Premier League by team
Welsh football clubs 2013–14 season
2013–14 UEFA Europa League participants seasons